More Politics is the fourth studio album by American rapper Termanology. It was released on November 18, 2016, through his own record label, ST. Records, Statik Selektah's Showoff Records, and Boston based label Brick Records. It serves as a sequel to Politics as Usual (2008).

Background
The album includes guest appearances from Bodega Bamz, Bun B, Chris Rivers, Conway, Crushboys, Cyrus DeShield, Ea$y Money, Joey Bada$$, Kendra Foster, KXNG CROOKED, Masspike Miles, Saigon, Sean Taylor, Sheek Louch, Styles P, Westside Gunn and Your Old Droog. The album features production from D.I.T.C.'s Buckwild, Dame Grease, Hi-Tek, J.U.S.T.I.C.E. League, Just Blaze, Nottz, Q-Tip and Statik Selektah.

Singles
On July 7, 2016, the first single from the album, "We're Both Wrong" featuring Saigon was released.
On October 7, 2016, he released the second single "I Dream B.I.G." featuring Sheek Louch & Styles P. The official music video for the single was released on November 1, 2016.

Track listing

References

2016 albums
Termanology albums
Albums produced by Buckwild
Albums produced by Dame Grease
Albums produced by Hi-Tek
Albums produced by J.U.S.T.I.C.E. League
Albums produced by Just Blaze
Albums produced by Nottz
Albums produced by Q-Tip (musician)
Albums produced by Statik Selektah